Batalovo is a rural locality (a selo) in Porozhnensky Selsoviet, Shipunovsky District, Altai Krai, Russia. The population was 378 as of 2013. There are 5 streets.

Geography 
Batalovo is located 44 km west of Shipunovo (the district's administrative centre) by road. Porozhneye is the nearest rural locality.

References 

Rural localities in Shipunovsky District